Liobagrus marginatus is a species of catfish in the family Amblycipitidae (the torrent catfishes) endemic to the province of Sichuan in China. This species reaches a length of  TL.

References

External links 

Liobagrus
Freshwater fish of China
Endemic fauna of Sichuan
Fish described in 1892
Taxa named by Albert Günther